Kabgan Rural District is in Kaki District of Dashti County, Bushehr province, Iran. At the census of 2006, its population was 4,850 in 1,138 households; there were 5,096 inhabitants in 1,365 households at the following census of 2011; and in the most recent census of 2016, the population of the rural district was 4,657 in 1,418 households. The largest of its 27 villages was Ziarat, with 699 people.

References 

Rural Districts of Bushehr Province
Populated places in Dashti County